Results of the Great Britain national rugby league team:

See also

Rugby league in the United Kingdom
List of Great Britain national rugby league team players
Great Britain national rugby league team
Great Britain women's national rugby league team

References

External links

Great Britain national rugby league team
British rugby league lists